"Ella Dice" (Spanish: "She Says") is a song by Argentine singer Tini featuring Argentine rapper Khea. It was released on July 15, 2020 by Hollywood Records, as the sixth single from Tini's third studio album Tini Tini Tini. The song was written by two singers alongside Ivo Alfredo, Thomas Seruue, Andrés Torres and Mauricio Rengifo.  The song was nominated in 2020 for the Gardel Awards in the category "Song of the Year".

Background
The song was produced by Andrés Torres and Mauricio Rengifo, the video for the song was directed by Diego Peskins and Nuno Gomes. The song was a trend in various parts of Latin America. It reached the charts of Argentina, Ecuador, Mexico and Uruguay.

Personnel
Credits adapted from Tidal.

 Tini – lead vocals, songwriter
 Khea – vocals, songwriter
 Andrés Torres – producer, songwriter, programming
 Mauricio Rengifo – producer, songwriter, programming
 DJ Riggins – assistant recording engineer
 Will Quinnell – assistant recording engineer
 Mike Seaberg – assistant recording engineer
 Jacob Richards – assistant recording engineer
 Marcelo Mato – recording engineer

Charts

Weekly charts

Year-end charts

Certifications

Awards and nominations

See also
List of Billboard Argentina Hot 100 top-ten singles in 2020

References

2020 singles
2020 songs
Tini (singer) songs
Spanish-language songs
Argentine songs
Latin trap songs
Reggaeton songs
Hollywood Records singles
Number-one singles in Argentina
Songs written by Andrés Torres (producer)
Song recordings produced by Andrés Torres (producer)
Songs written by Mauricio Rengifo